The women's singles event at the 2019 African Games was held from 24 to 29 August at the Cheminots Club.

Sandra Samir is the defending champion, who try defend her title, but she defeated by South African Chanel Simmonds in the semifinal.

This event is a qualification event to the 2020 Summer Olympics. The winner is qualify to the Women's singles event, if she meets the following requirements: Her ranking is within the top 300 on the ATP Singles Rankings of 7 June 2021 and doesn't qualify any other athlete from her nation via Direct Acceptance.

Mayar Sherif of Egypt won the gold medal, defeating South African Chanel Simmonds in the final, 6–3, 6–3.

Medalists

Seeds

Draw

Finals

Top half

Section 1

Section 2

Bottom half

Section 3

Section 4

References

External links
 Draw

Tennis at the 2019 African Games